Sven-Ove Jörgen Pettersson (born 11 July 1956 in Gothenburg, Sweden) is a retired Swedish ice hockey player. With Västra Frölunda IF, he won a silver medal in the Swedish Championship. The 1988–1989 season saw him qualifying for the Swedish Elite League.

After playing several seasons in Sweden with Västra Frölunda IF, he signed as a free agent in 1980 with the St. Louis Blues. Known as "The Handsome Swede" by Blues supporters, Petterson made an impact as an excellent first-line forward alongside Bernie Federko and Brian Sutter, setting the team record for points as a rookie with 73. Pettersson played five seasons with the Blues before being traded to the Hartford Whalers.  During the 1985–86 NHL season he was traded to the Washington Capitals in exchange for Doug Jarvis. Pettersson returned to Sweden to play for Frölunda, where he retired in 1991.

Career statistics

Regular season and playoffs

International

References

External links

1956 births
Living people
Frölunda HC players
Hartford Whalers players
St. Louis Blues players
Swedish ice hockey left wingers
Undrafted National Hockey League players
Washington Capitals players
Winnipeg Jets (WHA) draft picks
Ice hockey people from Gothenburg